Göttingen is a district in Lower Saxony, Germany. It is bounded by (from the northwest and clockwise) the districts of Northeim and Goslar, and by the states of Thuringia (district of Eichsfeld) and Hesse (districts of Werra-Meißner and Kassel).

History

In 1885 the Prussian government established the districts of Göttingen, Münden and Duderstadt within the Province of Hanover. These districts existed for 88 years, before they were merged in 1973 to form the present district of Göttingen.  On 1 November 2016, it was reformed by the addition of the former district of Osterode.

Geography

The western half of the district is occupied by the Weserbergland mountains. The Weser River receives its name near the town of Hannoversch Münden, where the Fulda joins the Werra. Further east the Leine river runs through the district from south to north.

Sights and Museums
 
A popular museum in the district of Göttingen is the Borderland Museum Eichsfeld which attracts around 50,000 visitors from many different countries every year. It deals with the inner-German border and the history of the GDR. The museum area includes a hiking trail along the former Iron Curtain.

Coat of arms

In the upper part is the heraldic lion of the Duchy of Brunswick-Lüneburg. Below is a combination of the arms of the former districts, which were merged in 1973 to form the present district: the shield of Münden, the anchor of Göttingen, and the wheel of Duderstadt.

Towns and municipalities

See also
Metropolitan region Hannover-Braunschweig-Göttingen-Wolfsburg

References

External links

Official website (German)

 
Districts of Lower Saxony